Francine Danielle Landry is a Canadian politician who was elected to the Legislative Assembly of New Brunswick in the 2014 provincial election. She represents the electoral district of Madawaska-les-Lacs-Edmundston as a member of the Liberal Party. She served as a Minister in the Gallant administration. She was re-elected in the 2018 and 2020 provincial elections.

References

1958 births
Living people
Women government ministers of Canada
Members of the Executive Council of New Brunswick
New Brunswick Liberal Association MLAs
People from Edmundston
Women MLAs in New Brunswick
21st-century Canadian politicians
21st-century Canadian women politicians